Sicilia! is a 1998 Italian black-and-white film directed by Danièle Huillet and Jean-Marie Straub. Sicilia! follows a man returning to visit his native Sicily, after living in New York City for many years.  The film is an adaptation of Elio Vittorini's anti-fascist novel Conversations in Sicily, which was first published in 1941.

Portuguese filmmaker Pedro Costa's documentary on Straub and Huillet, Où gît votre sourire enfoui? (alternately translated into English as Where Does Your Hidden Smile Lie? or Where Lies Your Hidden Smile?), was filmed while they were editing Sicilia!.

The film was screened in the Un Certain Regard section at the 1999 Cannes Film Festival.  It was included in the 37th New York Film Festival.

Cast
 Gianni Buscarino as the son
 Angela Nugara as the mother
 Vittorio Vigneri as the knife-grinder
 Carmelo Maddio as the orange-seller
 Ignazio Trombello as policeman
 Simone Nucatola as policeman
 Giovanni Interlandi as the traveler
 Mario Baschieri
 Giuseppe Bonta

Reception
In the British Film Institute’s 2012 Sight & Sound critics poll, Sicilia! received 7 votes and appeared at number 235.

References

External links 
 

1999 films
Italian black-and-white films
1990s Italian-language films
Films set in Sicily
Films directed by Jean-Marie Straub and Danièle Huillet
1999 drama films
Italian drama films
1990s Italian films